Lance Powell may refer to:

Lance Powell (Brookside), a character from Brookside
Lance Powell (The Bill), a character from The Bill